The Embassy of the United Kingdom in Madrid is the chief diplomatic mission of the United Kingdom in Spain. Since 2009 the Embassy has been located in the Torre Espacio skyscraper in the Cuatro Torres Business Area. The current British Ambassador to Spain is  Hugh Elliott.

History

The British Embassy in Madrid moved to its current location in the Torre Espacio skyscraper designed by Pei Cobb Freed in 2009. The Torre Espacio is also home to a number of other foreign embassies, including the Australian and Canadian. Prior to moving to Torre Espacio, the British Embassy was located on Fernando el Santo Street, in a  building designed by architect, William S. Bryant in 1966.

Other locations
Outside Madrid, there is a British Consulate General in Barcelona where the senior officer is known as the Consul-General. There are also Consulates in Alicante, Ibiza, Las Palmas de Gran Canaria, Málaga, Majorca and Santa Cruz de Tenerife.

The Embassy also represents the British Overseas Territories in Spain.

See also
Spain-United Kingdom relations
List of diplomatic missions in Spain
List of ambassadors of the United Kingdom to Spain

References

Madrid
United Kingdom
Buildings and structures in Fuencarral-El Pardo District, Madrid
Spain–United Kingdom relations